Blaise Robert Alexander Jr. (March 26, 1976 – October 4, 2001) was an American professional stock car racer from Montoursville, Pennsylvania. He began racing at the age of 12 in go-karts, winning the coveted World Karting Association East Regional championship in 1992. In 1995, he moved south to Mooresville, North Carolina and drove in the ARCA Racing Series.  Named ARCA's rookie of the year in 1996, Alexander was a regular driver in that series while also driving in both the NASCAR Busch Series and Craftsman Truck Series.

On October 4, 2001, during the ARCA EasyCare 100 at Lowe's Motor Speedway, Alexander's car crashed into the outside retaining wall nearly head-on. He died from a basilar skull fracture, the fifth driver death from rapid-deceleration head-and-neck movements in 17 months, convincing NASCAR to mandate the HANS or Hutchens devices for all drivers, despite the accident happening in ARCA.

Early life
Alexander was born on March 26, 1976 in Montoursville, Pennsylvania. He began his stock car career at age 12 in the World Karting Association and was the champion of the East Series in 1992. From that point, Alexander moved onto the Micro-Sprint racing series at tracks in different states including Pennsylvania, Ohio, and New York, posting a total of 48 wins in the series. In 1995, Alexander moved from Montoursville to Mooresville, North Carolina to pursue a racing career.

Racing career

ARCA
Alexander drove a few races in the ARCA Re-Max Series in 1995.  With a full season in 1996, Alexander won ARCA's Rookie of the Year Award. During his 1996 rookie season, Alexander pulled off a second-place finish at Lowe's Motor Speedway.  Alexander achieved two more second-place finishes in 1997. Alexander won his first ARCA race in 1998 at Toledo Speedway and won a second race the same year at Pocono Raceway. He led in 18 ARCA races for a total of 490 laps led. Alexander's final win came in July 2001, at Michigan International Speedway. Alexander earned a total of four career pole awards, in races at Michigan, Watkins Glen, Toledo and Winchester.

NASCAR
In 1997, still running fifteen races in ARCA, Alexander began driving in NASCAR in the Busch Series and the Craftsman Truck Series. He only raced twice in the truck series, and had modest success in Busch. Alexander signed to run for Team SABCO during the 2000 Busch season, posting two top-ten finishes and finishing 25th in points. After that year, he decided to return to the ARCA series in 2001.

Death

At the EasyCare 100 at Lowe's Motor Speedway on October 4, 2001, Alexander was involved in a 2-car accident during lap 63 of the race. He was fighting for the lead position with Kerry Earnhardt for most of the race. During the lap, Earnhardt had to dodge a lapped car by hitting his brakes, which caused Alexander's No. 75 to catch up to Earnhardt's No. 2. Alexander began to inch into the lead when Earnhardt's car made contact with Alexander's, sending Alexander's car head-on into the wall and then back into Earnhardt's car, causing Earnhardt to flip over onto his roof and slide into the grass. After the wreck, Earnhardt got away unharmed, while Alexander was knocked unconscious. The ARCA race officials quickly threw out the red flag to send rescue workers onto the track to check on Alexander. Earnhardt had already gotten out of his car and wanted to go check on Alexander, a friend of his. Officials would not allow Earnhardt to see him and was taken to the infield care center. Alexander was pronounced dead at the infield care center at 10:20 PM. He was 25 years old.  Alexander was interred at the Our Lady of Lourdes Catholic Church in his hometown of Montoursville, Pennsylvania.

Aftermath
Alexander's death, caused by a basilar skull fracture sustained in the impact, was the sixth in two years. Other high-profile drivers killed in this period included Dale Earnhardt (the father of Kerry Earnhardt, who was killed in February that same year), Adam Petty, Kenny Irwin Jr. and Tony Roper. As a result of Alexander's crash, NASCAR announced that the use of head and neck restraint devices would be required to keep drivers safe from these types of injuries, caused by rapid deceleration in wrecks. The use of such devices had been optional up until Alexander's death, though 41 out of 43 drivers in NASCAR's top series were already using them; only Tony Stewart and Jimmy Spencer had not worn them yet.

In response to these deaths, NASCAR eventually installed SAFER barriers on all NASCAR oval tracks. As of 2015, most tracks have the exterior walls covered with the barriers.

Legacy
After his 1995 move to North Carolina, Alexander enjoyed a close friendship with fellow Busch rookie driver and eventual NASCAR superstar, Jimmie Johnson, as they competed against each other on the track, while supporting each other off it. Other close relations included Spencer, who served as his mentor, and IndyCar driver P. J. Jones.

Alexander's memory has been honored by Johnson in several public and private ways. He dedicated his first Cup win to Alexander during a televised interview in Victory Lane, sent condolences in a Victory Lane interview after the death of Alexander's mother, and supported various charity causes and events that Alexander initiated in his hometown area of Central Pennsylvania. Shortly after Alexander's death, one of Johnson's crewmen drew a flame pattern with Alexander's initials on his driver's front left bumper; the tribute was continued in the form of a decal on Johnson's Cup cars.
There are quite a few Blaise Alexander automotive dealerships in Central Pennsylvania originally created from his family.

Motorsports career results

NASCAR
(key) (Bold – Pole position awarded by qualifying time. Italics – Pole position earned by points standings or practice time. * – Most laps led.)

Winston Cup Series

Busch Series

Craftsman Truck Series

ARCA Re/Max Series
(key) (Bold – Pole position awarded by qualifying time. Italics – Pole position earned by points standings or practice time. * – Most laps led.)

See also
 Driver deaths in motorsport

References

External links

1976 births
2001 deaths
Sportspeople from Williamsport, Pennsylvania
Racing drivers from Pennsylvania
ARCA Menards Series drivers
NASCAR drivers
NASCAR team owners
Racing drivers who died while racing
Filmed deaths in motorsport
Sports deaths in North Carolina
Burials in Pennsylvania